Bayram Mustafayev (born 23 May 1987, Baku, Azerbaijan SSR, USSR) is a three time European (2011, 2013, 2015) and world champion (2014) Paralympic judoka of Azerbaijan. Silver medalist of 2016 Summer Paralympics.

References 

Paralympic judoka of Azerbaijan
Judoka at the 2012 Summer Paralympics
Judoka at the 2016 Summer Paralympics
Recipients of the Tereggi Medal
1987 births
Living people
Medalists at the 2016 Summer Paralympics

Azerbaijani male judoka
Sportspeople from Baku
Paralympic medalists in judo
Paralympic silver medalists for Azerbaijan
21st-century Azerbaijani people
20th-century Azerbaijani people